Eslamabad-e Gharb County is in Kermanshah province, Iran, part of what is unofficially referred to as Iranian Kurdistan. The capital of the county is the city of Eslamabad-e Gharb. At the 2006 census, the county's population was 149,376 in 34,270 households. The following census in 2011 counted 151,473 people in 40,086 households. At the 2016 census, the county's population was 140,876 in 40,911 households.

Administrative divisions

The population history of Eslamabad-e Gharb County's administrative divisions over three consecutive censuses is shown in the following table. The latest census shows two districts, seven rural districts, and two cities.

See also
Kalhor

References

 

Counties of Kermanshah Province